The Western Colorado Mountaineers are the athletic teams that represent Western Colorado University, located in Gunnison, Colorado, in NCAA Division II intercollegiate sports. The Mountaineers compete as members of the Rocky Mountain Athletic Conference for all 11 varsity sports.

Facilities
Facilities include the 65,000 square-foot Mountaineer Field House, completed in 2014; Mountaineer Bowl (elevation ), completed in 1949, and Paul Wright Gym (elevation ).

Media
KEJJ 98.3 FM and KWSB 91.1 FM broadcasts many of Western's football, basketball and wrestling contests and all broadcasts can be heard online through KWSB.org.

Varsity sports
The Mountaineers have collected 98 RMAC team conference championships in all sports as of 2023.

Western Colorado has won 20 RMAC conference championships in football as of 2023. They were named conference champions in 1954, 1963, 1964, 1965, 1966, 1971, 1973, 1974, 1975, 1976, 1977, 1978, 1979, 1991, 1992, 1994, 1995, 1997, 1998, and 2021.

Individual National Championships since 1986 include Men's Indoor Track & Field (13 National Champions); since 1996, Women's Indoor Track & Field (8 National Champions); since 1985, Men's Outdoor Track & Field (20 National Champions); since 1987, Women's Outdoor Track & Field (25 National Champions); since 1993, Women's Cross Country (5 National Champions); since 1999, Men's Cross Country (3 National Champions); since 1963, Wrestling (16 National Champions); in 1968, Men's Swimming & Diving (1 National Champion); since 1957, Men's Skiing (7 National Champions); and since 1997, Women's Skiing (2 National Champions). Since 1963 there have been 15 national championships between the NCAA College Division, NCAA Division II, and NAIA classifications in Wrestling (2 National Championships); Women's Cross Country (4 National Championships); and Men's Cross Country (9 National Championships). Western's first conference championship in 1954 began a tradition of success that has led to 88 more Rocky Mountain Athletic Conference titles. Everett Brown earned the college's first All-America honor in 1934.

The Mountaineers have a combined 15 national team championships, 117 individual national NAIA or NCAA Division II championships, and 1,038 All-America honors since 1911.

Sports Illustrated's weekly "Faces in the Crowd" section has featured seven student-athletes, coaches, and administrators since 1959.

Teams

Men's sports
 Basketball
 Cross Country
 Football
 Track & Field (indoor and outdoor)
 Wrestling

Women's sports
 Basketball
 Cross Country
 Soccer
 Swimming & Diving
 Track & Field (indoor and outdoor)
 Volleyball

Track & Field
The men's and women's indoor/outdoor track and field program in addition to the cross country program has been particularly successful, producing numerous team national championships including many individual national champions and All-Americans.

In 2016–17, Alicja Konieczek became the first Mountaineer to win four national track and field titles. She has since won four more national titles—the most by any female in Western's history.

National championships

Team

Mountain Sports and Club Sports

Mountain Sports 

 Alpine Skiing
Nordic Skiing
Freeride Skiing and Snowboarding
 Mountain Biking
 Road Cycling 
 Trail Running

Club Sports 

 Men's Baseball
 Men's and Women's Boxing
 Figure Skating (co-rec)
 Men's and Women's Ice Hockey
 Men's and Women's Rugby
 Men's and Women's Soccer
 Women's Volleyball

References

External links